Jack Flaherty (born 1995) is an American baseball pitcher for the St. Louis Cardinals.

Jack Flaherty may also refer to:
 Jack Flaherty (gymnast) (1908–1980), British Olympic gymnast
 Jack Flaherty (politician) (born  1931), Canadian politician and former member of the Legislative Assembly of Alberta

See also
John Flaherty (disambiguation)